The Calcutta Chemical Company was a pharmaceutical company established in the city of Calcutta (now Kolkata) in 1916 by K.C. Das, B.N. Maitra, and R.N. Sen. Its founding was at the time of the Swadeshi Movement in Bengal, where the spirit of entrepreneurship was encouraged in opposition to British manufactured goods. Although it manufactured a variety of products, the company was best known for being the originators of Margo soap and Neem Toothpaste, as well as Lavender Dew Powder. It was primarily run by the Dasgupta family (descendants of K.C. Das) until its acquisition by Shaw Wallace. It was then further sold to German consumer goods company Henkel, which incorporated Henkel India. More recently, the company once again changed hands and was acquired by VVF, a contract soap manufacturer, while Henkel retained the rights to the products and focused on their marketing.

The company was owned by the family of senior journalist and Rajya Sabha MP Swapan Dasgupta until its acquisition by Shaw Wallace.

Popular brands 
 Margo (soap) 
 Neem Toothpaste 
 Aramusk Soap 
 Chek Detergent 
 Lavender Dew Powder
 MahaBhringraj Oil

References 

Manufacturing companies based in Kolkata
Indian companies established in 1916
Pharmaceutical companies established in 1916
Pharmaceutical companies of India